Ilona Timchenko is a Russian pianist and composer, b. 1976, settled in O Pino, close to Santiago de Compostela.

References
  Beethoven International Piano Competition, Bonn

Russian classical pianists
Male classical pianists
Russian women pianists
Living people
21st-century classical pianists
Year of birth missing (living people)
21st-century Russian male musicians
21st-century women pianists